Brian Kirk is an Irish film and television director who has directed episodes of Game of Thrones, FX's The Riches and Showtime's Brotherhood and The Tudors. He also directed the television film My Boy Jack starring David Haig and Daniel Radcliffe and based on the play of the same name.

Career
Kirk has been named to direct the thriller Midnight Delivery for Universal Pictures. Guillermo del Toro will produce the film. In July 2013 Kevin Costner was in talks to star in the film.

Filmography
Film
 Middletown (2006)
 21 Bridges (2019)

Television
Pulling Moves (2004)
Episode #1.01: "Claimitis"
Episode #1.02: "Meat Is Murder"
Episode #1.03: "The Quiz"
Episode #1.04: "Dog Eat Dog"
Episode #1.05: "Spousal Arousal"
Murphy's Law (2004–2005):
Episode #2.01: "Jack's Back"
Episode #2.02: "Bent Moon on the Rise"
Episode #3.01: "The Goodbye Look"
Episode #3.03: "Strongbox"
Donovan (2005)
Funland (2005)
Episode #1.08
Episode #1.09
Episode #1.10
Episode #1.11
The Riches (2007):
Episode #1.05: "The Big Floss"
Episode #1.07 "Virgin Territory"
The Tudors (2007):
Episode #1.05: "Arise, My Lord"
Episode #1.06 "True Love"
Brotherhood (2006–2007)
Episode #1.10 "Vivekchaudamani" 51 (2006)
Episode #2.02: "Down in the Flood 3:5-6"
My Boy Jack (2007) (TV movie)
Father & Son (2009)
Dexter (2009):
Episode #4.02: "Remains to Be Seen"
Luther (2010):
Episode #1.01: "Episode 1"
Episode #1.02: "Episode 2"
Boardwalk Empire (2010):
Episode #1.08: "Hold Me in Paradise"
Game of Thrones (2011):
Episode #1.03: "Lord Snow"
Episode #1.04: "Cripples, Bastards, and Broken Things"
Episode #1.05: "The Wolf and the Lion"
Great Expectations (2011)
Luck (2012):
Episode #1.05  "Episode Five"
Episode #1.07  "Episode Seven"
Hard Sun (2018)
Episode #1.01: "The Sun, The Moon, The Truth"
Episode #1.02: "One Thousand, Eight Hundred Days"

References

External links

Living people
Television directors from Northern Ireland
British film directors
Hugo Award winners
People from Armagh (city)
Year of birth missing (living people)